Nāma is Sanskrit for name. In this context its meaning is the creative power. Alternate meanings in the Granth Sahib include shabad (word), kirtan (melody). In Arabic it is kalama (kalam meaning "pen") "a" indicates something that's written by pen, in Chinese it means tao. Simran means repetition of, or meditation on, the name of the divine and is the principal method or tool which is meant to unite the soul with the Paramatman, Allah, or God.

See also
 Dhikr
 Ik Onkar
 Jaap Sahib
 Japa
 Nām Japō
 Namarupa 
 Names of God
 Nembutsu
 Om
 Shabda
 Simran
 Universal Sufism
 Vedic chant

External links
 Naam or Word
 Naam Yoga Meditation

Names of God